The Gardon d'Alès is a tributary of the Gardon in the Lozère and Gard departments, France. Its source is in the Cévennes near Saint-Privat-de-Vallongue. It flows through the town Alès and joins the Gardon near Ners.

References

Rivers of France
Rivers of Lozère
Rivers of Gard
Rivers of Occitania (administrative region)